The 1946 Southern Jaguars football team was an American football team that represented Southern University as a member of the Southwestern Athletic Conference (SWAC) during the 1946 college football season. In their 11th season under head coach Ace Mumford, the Jaguars compiled a 9–2–1 record, won the SWAC championship, shut out four of 12 opponents, and outscored all opponents by a total of 390 to 95.

The Dickinson System rated Southern in a tie with Lincoln (MO) as the No. 7 black college football team for 1946. Southern ranked first in scoring offense among the black college teams with an average of 30.75 point per game. 

Southern tackle Robert Smith was selected as a first-team player on The Pittsburgh Courier's 1946 All-America team. In addition, Fontenberry was named to the second team as a guard, and back Keyes was named to the third team as a back.

The team played its home games at University Stadium in Scotlandville, Louisiana (which has since been annexed into the Baton Rouge city limits).

Schedule

References

Southern
Southern Jaguars football seasons
Southwestern Athletic Conference football champion seasons
Southern Jaguars football